The following radio stations broadcast on FM frequency 102.3 MHz:

Argentina
 Aspen in Buenos Aires
 LRI732 Shock in Carcarañá, Santa Fe

Australia
 ABC Classic FM in Canberra, Australian Capital Territory
 5ADD in Adelaide, South Australia
 2ROX in Port Macquarie, New South Wales
3RBA in Ballarat, Victoria

Canada (Channel 272)
 CBAF-FM-1 in Saint John, New Brunswick
 CBCI-FM in Fort Albany, Ontario
 CBCY-FM in Haileybury, Ontario
 CBE-1-FM in Windsor, Ontario
 CBMX-FM in St-August-Saguenay, Quebec
 CBON-FM-29 in Marathon, Ontario
 CBYA-FM in Aiyansh, British Columbia
 CHSN-FM in Estevan, Saskatchewan
 CHST-FM in London, Ontario
 CIAK-FM in Lytton, British Columbia
 CIGB-FM in Trois-Rivieres, Quebec
 CINQ-FM in Montreal, Quebec
 CJNR-FM in Windsor, Ontario
 CJNS-FM in Meadow Lake, Saskatchewan
 CKJJ-FM in Belleville, Ontario
 CKNO-FM in Edmonton, Alberta
 CKRX-FM in Fort Nelson, British Columbia
 CKWV-FM in Nanaimo, British Columbia
 CKXG-FM in Grand Falls-Windsor, Newfoundland and Labrador
 CKY-FM in Winnipeg, Manitoba
 VF2378 in Campbell Road, British Columbia
 VF2454 in Muskey River Mine, Alberta
 VF7044 in Musselwhite Mine Site, Ontario

China 
 CNR Cross-Strait Radio in Fuzhou, Putian and east of Quanzhou
 CNR Music Radio in Daqing
 CNR The Voice of China in Jinzhou

France
Oui FM at Paris

Indonesia
 Hijrah Radio in Batam and Singapore

Malaysia
 Melaka FM in Malacca and Northern Johor
 Raaga in Alor Setar, Kedah, Perlis & Penang
 TraXX FM in Brunei & Limbang, Sarawak

Mexico
 XHAGE-FM in Acapulco, Guerrero
 XHANU-FM in Autlán de Navarro, Jalisco
 XHCST-FM in Castaños, Coahuila
 XHFEL-FM in San Felipe de Jesús, Sonora
 XHGEC-FM in Ciudad Acuña, Coahuila
 XHIPM-FM in Mérida, Yucatán
 XHMW-FM in Nuevo Laredo, Tamaulipas
 XHOO-FM in Guanajuato, Guanajuato
 XHPEEN-FM in Sabinas, Coahuila
 XHSCDQ-FM in Guadalajara, Jalisco
 XHSCJH-FM in Axochiapan, Morelos
 XHSIBX-FM in San Andrés Chicahuaxtla, Putla Villa De Guerrero Municipality, Oaxaca
 XHSMC-FM in Sierra Mojada, Coahuila
 XHSPP-FM in San Pedro Pochutla, Oaxaca
 XHTSC-FM in Cananea, Sonora

Philippines 
DZYB in Baguio City
DZRT in Puerto Princesa City
DWKV in Lipa City
DZGN in Sorsogon City
DYBC in Bacolod City
DYRD-FM in Tagbilaran City
DYCT in Tacloban City
DXIX in Iligan City
DXCG in Tagum City
DXCJ in General Santos City
DXNS-FM in Butuan City

Sierra Leone
 Capital Radio in Bo

Spain 
 XORadio in Murcia

Taiwan 
 Transfer CNR Cross-Strait Radio in Matsu

United States (Channel 272)
 KANB-LP in Kalispell, Montana
  in Boyce, Louisiana
 KBLO in Corcoran, California
  in Columbia, Missouri
 KCCP-LP in South Padre Island, Texas
  in Dardanelle, Arkansas
 KCRX-FM in Seaside, Oregon
 KCSK-LP in Hanamaulu, Hawaii
  in Cresco, Iowa
 KDEX-FM in Dexter, Missouri
  in Antlers, Oklahoma
  in Randolph, Utah
 KEDU-LP in Ruidoso, New Mexico
  in Brownsville, Oregon
 KGDA-LP in Fort Smith, Arkansas
  in Haines, Alaska
 KHWA in Weed, California
  in Coeur D'alene, Idaho
 KJJJ in Laughlin, Nevada
  in Compton, California
  in Modesto, California
 KKPN in Rockport, Texas
  in Volga, South Dakota
  in Clovis, New Mexico
 KLFZ in Jacksonville, Texas
 KMRE-LP in Bellingham, Washington
 KOWY in Dayton, Wyoming
 KOZQ-FM in Waynesville, Missouri
 KPEZ in Austin, Texas
 KPNY in Alliance, Nebraska
  in Fordyce, Arkansas
 KQNU in Onawa, Iowa
 KRCQ in Detroit Lakes, Minnesota
 KRHQ in Indio, California
 KRMG-FM in Sand Springs, Oklahoma
  in Kearney, Nebraska
 KSAQ in Charlotte, Texas
 KSJH-LP in Hart, Texas
 KSPK-FM in Walsenburg, Colorado
 KSSQ-LP in Siloam Springs, Arkansas
  in Colt, Arkansas
 KUTQ in La Verkin, Utah
 KUVA in Uvalde, Texas
  in Gunnison, Colorado
 KVOQ in Greenwood Village, Colorado
  in Wendover, Nevada
  in Woodward, Oklahoma
  in Wichita Falls, Texas
 KWRL in La Grande, Oregon
  in Clifton, Arizona
 KWXM in Simsboro, Louisiana
  in Dubuque, Iowa
 KXYL-FM in Coleman, Texas
  in Point Arena, California
 KYYT in Goldendale, Washington
 KZRN in Hettinger, North Dakota
  in Apple Valley, California
 WAIV in Cape May, New Jersey
 WAKC in Concord, New Hampshire
  in Opp, Alabama
  in Wautoma, Wisconsin
 WBAB in Babylon, New York
 WBQE-LP in Brooklyn, New York
 WBSC-LP in Bamberg, South Carolina
 WBTO-FM in Petersburg, Indiana
 WBTQ in Weston, West Virginia
  in Carlisle, Pennsylvania
 WCBK-FM in Martinsville, Indiana
 WCXX in Madawaska, Maine
 WDNP-LP in Dover, Ohio
  in Pound, Virginia
 WEBQ-FM in Eldorado, Illinois
 WEKL in Augusta, Georgia
  in Roanoke, Alabama
 WEXI-LP in Hallandale, Florida
  in Lumberton, North Carolina
  in Galion, Ohio
  in Auburn, Indiana
  in Gulfport, Mississippi
  in Soddy-Daisy, Tennessee
  in Port Huron, Michigan
  in Pageland, South Carolina
  in Truro, Massachusetts
 WGYS-LP in Dixfield, Maine
 WHIV-LP in New Orleans, Louisiana
  in Houghton, Michigan
  in Whitehall, Wisconsin
 WIXM in Grand Isle, Vermont
 WKBR-LP in Town of Highlands, New York
 WKJO in Smithfield, North Carolina
  in Teutopolis, Illinois
 WKKF in Ballston Spa, New York
  in Wilmington, Ohio
 WKZF in Morton, Illinois
  in Milledgeville, Georgia
  in Logansport, Indiana
  in Buford, Georgia
 WLLI in Munfordville, Kentucky
  in Somerset, Kentucky
  in Jensen Beach, Florida
  in Saint Andrews, South Carolina
 WMIO in Cabo Rojo, Puerto Rico
  in Bethesda, Maryland
  in Stonington, Connecticut
 WMQV-LP in Kissimmee, Florida
 WMQX in Pittston, Pennsylvania
  in Hinton, West Virginia
  in Holland, Ohio
  in Roanoke Rapids, North Carolina
 WQHZ in Erie, Pennsylvania
 WQTC-FM in Manitowoc, Wisconsin
  in Rome, Georgia
 WRMJ in Aledo, Illinois
 WSIZ-FM in Jacksonville, Georgia
  in Ripley, Mississippi
 WSUS in Franklin, New Jersey
  in Sault Sainte Marie, Michigan
 WTPJ-LP in York, South Carolina
 WUPC-LP in Arrowhead Village, New Jersey
  in Canandaigua, New York
  in Viroqua, Wisconsin
  in Cairo, Georgia
 WWMY in Beech Mountain, North Carolina
 WWQB in Westwood, Kentucky
  in Philadelphia, Mississippi
  in Waukegan, Illinois
  in Louisville, Kentucky
 WXUS in Dunnellon, Florida
 WXXS in Lancaster, New Hampshire
  in Big Rapids, Michigan
  in Crete, Illinois
 WYET in New Carlisle, Indiana
 WYOT in Rochelle, Illinois
  in Humboldt, Tennessee
  in Crozet, Virginia

References

Lists of radio stations by frequency